Arvis Vilkaste (born 8 April 1989) is a Latvian bobsledder, brakeman who has competed since 2010.

He won a gold medal in the four-man event at the FIBT World Championships 2016 in Igls, Austria (with pilot Oskars Melbārdis, Daumants Dreiškens and Jānis Strenga). It was the first ever World Championships gold medal in bobsled for Latvia.

He also won a bronze medal in the four-man event at FIBT World Championships 2015 in Winterberg, Germany as well as 2012 World Junior Championship title in the four-man event.

Vilkaste competed in 2014 Winter Olympics at Sochi and won a silver medal in the four-man event.

He became the four-man European Champion in 2015 and finished 3rd in the four-man event in 2016 Bobsleigh European Championship.

At the 2014–15 Bobsleigh World Cup season Vilkaste as Oskars Melbārdis brakeman has 8 from 8 podium finishes in four-man events, including five first places.

Before becoming a bobsledder, Vilkaste was a sprinter, winning a gold medal at the 4x100 relay at the 2008 Latvian Athletics Championships.

References
Arvis Vilkaste profile at the FIBT homepage

External links

1989 births
Latvian male bobsledders
Living people
Bobsledders at the 2014 Winter Olympics
Bobsledders at the 2018 Winter Olympics
Olympic bobsledders of Latvia
Medalists at the 2014 Winter Olympics
Olympic medalists in bobsleigh
Olympic gold medalists for Latvia
People from Balvi Municipality